John David Evans (born 24 March 1941) is an English footballer, who played as a full back in the Football League for Chester.

References

Chester City F.C. players
1941 births
Living people
Rhyl F.C. players
Association football fullbacks
English Football League players
People from Chester
English footballers